The Umoja Orchestra was a Gainesville, FL-based band whose music incorporated elements from afrobeat, jazz, funk, afro-cuban as well as traditional African, Caribbean and South American styles like salsa and merengue. The band's instrumentation was modeled closely to bands such as Fela Kuti's Africa 70 and the Antibalas Afrobeat Orchestra.

Umoja Orchestra was a strong presence in the Gainesville music scene. The band was especially known for its energetic, crowd-pleasing, and dance-oriented live performances, usually selling out local venues and putting on spectacular shows. They have gone on three national tours, mostly through the East Coast, but as far as Texas. The name "Umoja" comes from the Swahili word for "unity".

Members
Sebastián López Velásquez: Guitar, Vocals, Charango, Accordion
Natalia Pérez: Vocals, Percussion
Michael Pedron: Bass
Michael Claytor: Banjo, Percussion
David Borenstein: Saxophone, Clarinet
Irving Campbell: Saxophone
Jason Prover: Trumpet
Evan Hegarty: Keyboard
Keegan Jerabek: Trumpet
Evan Garfield: Drumset
Doug Fischer: Trombone
Micah Shalom: Trombone
David Choo: Saxophone
Adam Finkelman: Percussion, Timbales
Scott Bihorel: Congas
Scott Clayton: Guitar
Paul Kronk: Guitar
Johnny Frias: Congas

Discography
Dinner at the Republic 2009
Abre la Puerta 2008
Umoja Means Unity 2007

See also
Afrobeat
Fela Kuti
Antibalas Afrobeat Orchestra
World Music
descarga

External links
Umoja Orchestra On Myspace
Official Website
Facebook Page

American funk musical groups
American jazz ensembles
American world music groups